Lehmann Aviation Ltd (France), designs and manufactures professional civilian drones/UAVs since 2005. The company has two lines of UAVs: L-A series line of fully automatic drones designed for high precision mapping; construction/mining and precision agriculture; and L-M series line of both automatic and ground-controlled drones for long-range real-time surveillance.

L-A series
The L-A series was launched in 2012 with the release of LA100 fully automatic personal drone for GoPro users (out of production). The series was then extended in 2013 to LA200, LA300 and later LA300AG drones, designed for corporate communications, mapping/mining/construction and precision agriculture, respectively.

L-A series 2016

In July 2016 Lehmann Aviation announced launch of a totally new L-A series, redesigned from scratch, comprising three fully automatic (for people with no piloting background) light-weight (1250gr/44oz) aircraft for three major mapping applications:

•LA500 for mining and construction

•LA500-AG for precision agriculture

•LA500-RTK for highly accurate mapping and DEM.

The UAS are made of aluminium, carbon fibre and EPP foam and have a distinctive modular design, which enables to replace or upgrade any part of the drone if needed without changing the whole system. The new drones were also designed with detachable winglets for easier transportation.

The LA500, LA500-AG and LA500-RTK work with Sony α6000 (24.3Mp on a large APS-C sensor), multispectral Sequoia (LA500-AG only), thermal Flir View Pro and  GoPro Hero4 cameras which enables to take images at up to 25 km/15.5miles range and 45 minutes flight time. All L-A series drones are hand-launched. They follow the pre-programmed flight path automatically, however, the ground control can be taken at any time by the operator. They land autonomously in just few meters.

All Lehmann drones are programmed and controlled through Lehmann OperationCenter software for Windows 10.

L-M series
The L-M series was launched in 2007 with the release of LP960 UAS and was then extended to LV580 (2009) and LM450 (2010) (all out of production).

The major application of the new L-M series (coming in 2017) is long range and long endurance real-time surveillance.

First models (out of production)

LA100
Lehmann Aviation LA100 is a fully automatic lightweight SUAV launched by Lehmann Aviation in November 2012 (out of production).

The LA100 is a totally autonomous drone. It was designed to be used by people even without any piloting background. Working with
GoPro camera it enabled to capture professional quality aerial images and video. Financial Times called the LA100 "a personal “drone” that will carry camcorders into the sky to capture aerial footage"

The LA100 follows a pre-programmed flight path. The operational procedure implies mounting GoPro camera on the wing (GoPro Hero, Hero2, Hero 3 for oblique images or Hero3 for vertical images), switching the engine on by reclining the aircraft and launching it by hand. The LA100 is capturing footage from a height of 100 meters for 4min30sec and then coming back to the launch site with HD aerial photos or videos on the SD card.

“With our UAVs, we want to bring to people the opportunity to have a better understanding of the Earth. LA100 is like aerial binoculars,” Benjamin Lehmann told to MIT Technology Review.

The LA100 introduced Lehmann Aviation L-A series of fully automatic civil SUAV.

The LA100 has become world's first totally autonomous micro civil UAV enabling amateurs to take high-quality aerial images.

LA200
Lehmann Aviation LA200 is a fully automatic lightweight SUAV launched by Lehmann Aviation in July 2013.

The LA200 is a totally autonomous UAV. It was designed for people with no piloting background and it does not require any training. It works with GoPro Hero, Hero2 or Hero3 camera and enables to capture professional quality aerial images and video (up to 12 Mp). It was initially done for TV channels, documentaries and corporate communications.

The LA200 works with any Windows 8 touchscreen tablet needed for setting up flight parameters. For flight preparation and mission control the user has to «draw» on a touchscreen tablet the area of interest and enter waypoints. Afterwards Lehmann’s OperationCenter automatically generates missions and programs the drone. The flight data is then to be transmitted to the drone via WI-FI. After mounting GoPro Hero, Hero2 or Hero3 on the wing and launching the drone by hand, the user has to wait until it automatically flies over the chosen waypoints and lands.

LA300
Lehmann Aviation LA300 is a fully automatic professional lightweight SUAV designed for most accurate mapping and DEM. It was launched by Lehmann Aviation in July 2013. The LA300 belongs to Lehmann Aviation L-A series of fully automatic UAVs.

The LA300 is a totally autonomous UAV designed for people with no piloting background. It first worked with Nokia Lumia 1020 mobile phone and GoPro camera. Since 2015 the drone works with GoPro Hero, Canon S110 day or NIR and thermal camera and enables to capture professional quality aerial images. The drone was designed to do professional orthomosaic and DEM for the needs of geodesy/mapping, agricultural sector (surfaces and volume calculation, detection of damaged crops), mining and construction.

The LA300 works with any Windows 8 touchscreen tablet which enables user to set up flight parameters and geotag images. For flight preparation and mission control the user has to «draw» on a touchscreen tablet area of interest and enter waypoints. Afterwards Lehmann’s OperationCenter automatically generates missions and programs the drone. The flight data is then to be transmitted to the drone via WI-FI. After mounting Nokia Lumia 1020 on the wing and launching the drone by hand, the user has to wait until it automatically flies over the chosen waypoints and lands.

The LA300 flies at range of up to 15 km, at speeds of 20–80 km/h.

SPECIFICATIONS:

LP960

The Lehmann Aviation LP960 is a lightweight small UAV designed by Lehmann Aviation Ltd in 2007 (out of production). LP960 is the first commercialized UAV of the company.

The(Digital Elevation Model) and HD vertical images for the needs of public and private sectors (reconnaissance, security, scientific research, mapping, agriculture). According to Réponses Photo, the system "could be used inter alia in urban areas".  The Ground Control System of LP960 became the prototype for the ground control systems of other UAVs of Lehmann Aviation (LV580 and LM450).

LV580

The Lehmann Aviation LV580 is a lightweight small UAV designed by Lehmann Aviation in 2009 (out of production).

LV580 was designed for live day and night aerial survey. As soon as LV580 was launched, the customers of Lehmann Aviation became "construction and geodesy companies as well as scientific organisations". The Ground Control System for LV580 is the same as for the other models of Lehmann Aviation: LP960 and LM450, which provides interoperability of Lehmann Aviation products.

LM450
The Lehmann Aviation LM450 is a lightweight small UAV launched by Lehmann Aviation in 2010 (out of production).

The system was designed for longer range missions to take oblique still images (11Mp), full HD or real-time videos. LM450 was the first UAV of Lehmann Aviation to be launched with an advanced navigation system which enabled fully autonomous flights. LM450 is based on the same technology as the other UAS of Lehmann Aviation (LP960 and LV580) and is managed through a common Ground Control System.

LM450 UAV was designed mostly for corporate communication purposes.

SPECIFICATIONS:

Notes

External links 
 
 L-A series technical specifications 

Unmanned aerial vehicles of France